Grabowo-Osada  is a settlement in the administrative district of Gmina Lubawa, within Iława County, Warmian-Masurian Voivodeship, in northern Poland.

References

Grabowo-Osada